The table below lists the judgments of the Constitutional Court of South Africa delivered in 1995, the first year of the court's existence.

The eleven members of the court appointed at its formation were President Arthur Chaskalson, Deputy President Ismail Mahomed, and judges Lourens Ackermann, John Didcott, Richard Goldstone, Johann Kriegler, Pius Langa, Tholie Madala, Yvonne Mokgoro, Kate O'Regan and Albie Sachs. Justice Goldstone was granted leave of absence to serve as chief prosecutor of the International Criminal Tribunal for the former Yugoslavia and the International Criminal Tribunal for Rwanda. His seat was filled over the court of the year by acting judges Sydney Kentridge, John Trengove and Bernard Ngoepe.

References
 
 

1995
Constitutional Court
Constitutional Court of South Africa